Ladies & Gentlemen is a Bangladeshi drama streaming television series created by Mostofa Sarwar Farooki. Starring Tasnia Farin as Sabila Hossain, an ordinary girl, and also co-starred Afzal Hossain, Hasan Masood, Maria Nur, Partha Barua, Chanchal Chowdhury, Iresh Zaker, Mostafa Monwar, Mamunur Rashid and Saberi Alam. the series has been released on 9 July 2021 on ZEE5.

Premise
The series follows the personal journey of Sabila (Tasnia Farin), a common girl, who becomes the voice of every working woman in Bangladesh and beyond. The show brings out the complexity of male-female dynamics and hierarchical exploitations and misogyny.

Cast
 Tasnia Farin as Sabila Hossain
 Afzal Hossain as Khairul Alom
 Maria Nur as Laura
 Hasan Masood as Mizu/Mizanur Rahaman
 Partha Barua as Imtiyaz
 Mamunur Rashid as Sabila's Father
 Saberi Alam
 Mostafa Monwar as Arif
 Iresh Zaker as Jahir
 Nader Chowdhury 
 Chanchal Chowdhury (special appearance)

Release
On 14 June 2021, the official trailer for the series was released at a virtual press conference.

Music
The first song of the series was released on ZEE5's YouTube channel on 3 Jul 2021.

Episodes

Series 1 (2021)

Awards

References

External links
 Ladies & Gentlemen on ZEE5

Bengali-language web series
Bangladeshi web series
ZEE5 original programming
2021 Bangladeshi television series debuts
2020s Bangladeshi drama television series